Helen Palmer may refer to:

Helen Palmer (archer) (born 1974), British archer
Helen Palmer (publisher) (1917–1979), Australian publisher, educationalist, author, historian and communist
Helen Palmer (author) (1899–1967), children's book author and wife of Theodor Geisel (Dr. Seuss)
Helen Chenoweth-Hage (born Helen Margaret Palmer, 1938-2006), American politician